Ignat Kovalev is a Russian sprint canoer who competed in the late 1990s. He won two medals in the C-4 1000 m event at the ICF Canoe Sprint World Championships with a gold in 1999 and a silver in 1998.

References

Living people
Russian male canoeists
Year of birth missing (living people)
ICF Canoe Sprint World Championships medalists in Canadian